Thekke Kidangoor is a village near Angamaly Town. It is situated 5 km from Nedumbassery airport. This is the birthplace of Cardinal Joseph Parekkattil.

References 

Villages in Ernakulam district